John Joseph O'Connor (June 11, 1855 – May 20, 1927) was an American prelate of the Catholic Church. He served as Bishop of Newark from 1901 until his death in 1927.

Early life and education
O'Connor was born in Newark, New Jersey to Thomas and Catherine (née Farrell) O'Connor, Irish immigrants. His father worked as a contractor and builder. He received his early education at the parochial school of St. James the Less Church in Newark, and then attended a private school run by Bernard Kearney in the same city. He studied at Seton Hall University in South Orange, where he earned a Bachelor of Arts degree in 1873. He was then sent by Bishop Winand Wigger to study theology at the Pontifical North American College in Rome, where he remained for four years. He then studied for one year at the American College of Louvain in Belgium.

Priesthood
On December 22, 1877, O'Connor was ordained to the priesthood by Bishop Carlo Andrea Anthonis at St. Rumbold's Cathedral in Mechelen. Following his return to New Jersey, he was appointed professor of philosophy and dogmatic theology at Seton Hall. He later became director of Immaculate Conception Seminary at Seton Hall. In addition, he served as chaplain of St. Mary's Orphanage and assisted at parishes in Irvington and Short Hills on weekends. He was named vicar general of the Diocese of Newark in 1892 and then rector of St. Joseph's Church in Newark in 1895.

Episcopacy
On May 24, 1901, O'Connor was appointed the fourth Bishop of Newark by Pope Leo XIII. He received his episcopal consecration on the following July 25 from Archbishop Michael Corrigan, with Bishops Charles McDonnell and James McFaul serving as co-consecrators, at St. Patrick's Cathedral in Newark.

During his tenure, O'Connor presided over a period of explosive growth for the diocese. The Catholic population more than doubled, standing at over 683,000 by the time of his death. He increased the number of churches from 114 to 273, the number of priests from 265 to 712, and the number of Catholic school students from 35,330 to 82,462. He also established over 45 missions and chapels. He continued to oversee the construction of the Cathedral of the Sacred Heart, which had been initiated by Bishop James Roosevelt Bayley.

In 1903, O'Connor condemned the oath of the International Typographical Union and forbade Catholics from taking it, saying, "A man owes his allegiance first to God. That is equivalent to the allegiance he owes his Church. If this oath or pledge requires the members of a union to do anything which the Catholic Church forbids—it being a religious organization as described in the oath—no Catholic can conscientiously take the oath or make such a pledge." He was made Assistant at the Pontifical Throne by Pope Pius X in 1910. In 1926, fear of accidents caused O'Connor to prohibit the priests of Newark from owning or driving motor vehicles, except in rural parishes.

O'Connor died of bronchial asthma in South Orange, New Jersey, at age 71. He is buried at the Cathedral of the Sacred Heart.

References

External links
Roman Catholic Archdiocese of Newark
Papers of John J. O'Connor, ADN 0002-004, in the Archives of the Archdiocese of Newark located at Seton Hall University.

1855 births
1927 deaths
Seton Hall University alumni
American College of the Immaculate Conception alumni
American Roman Catholic clergy of Irish descent
Roman Catholic bishops of Newark
Catholic University of Leuven (1834–1968) alumni
20th-century Roman Catholic bishops in the United States
Burials in New Jersey